Moolakadai Junction is an important road junction in Chennai, India. It is located at Moolakadai at the intersection of the Grand Northern Trunk Road (NH 5), Madhavaram High Road, Tondiarpet High Road, Kamaraj Road.

Moolakadai is primarily a high traffic area in North Chennai due to the movement of Heavy vehicles (mainly containers) as most of those heavy vehicles have to pass through Moolakadai in order to reach the Chennai Port.

For those who come from South Chennai, Moolakadai acts as the gateway to the areas like

History of moolakadai was that once a tea shop was situated corner of all three side roads connecting spot which used renowned landmark of that period  Madhavaram, Kodungaiyur, Madhavaram Milk Colony, Mathur MMDA, Manali, Vyasarpadi, Puzhal, Redhills, Karanodai.

Construction History
The Flyover constructing work is started by January 2011.

The Construction work delayed due to reasons such as election period, land acquisition which results anger the residents which suffering high traffic congestion.

On 4 May 2015, the state government of Tamil Nadu informed Madras High Court that the bridge should be opened for public in 3 months.

Opened for Public Service
The Moolakadai Flyover was opened on 13 November 2015.

See also

Madhavaram Junction
Koyambedu Junction
Kathipara Junction
Padi Junction
Maduravoyal Junction
Irumbuliyur Junction
Madhya Kailash Junction

References

Road interchanges in India
Bridges and flyovers in Chennai
Road junctions in India
Interchanges of Chennai HSCTC